The following is a list of nature centers and environmental education centers in the United States.

Alabama

Alaska

Arizona

Arkansas

California

Colorado

Connecticut

Delaware

District of Columbia

Florida

Georgia

Hawaii

Idaho

Illinois

Indiana

Iowa

Kansas

Kentucky

Louisiana

Maine

Maryland

Massachusetts

Michigan

Minnesota

Mississippi

Missouri

Montana

Nebraska

Nevada

New Hampshire

New Jersey

New Mexico

New York

North Carolina

North Dakota

Ohio

Oklahoma

Oregon

Pennsylvania

Rhode Island

South Carolina

South Dakota

Tennessee

Texas

Utah

Vermont

Virginia

Washington

West Virginia

Wisconsin

Wyoming

See also
 List of botanical gardens and arboretums in the United States
 List of science museums in the United States
 List of natural history museums
 List of nature centers in Canada
 Nature center for nature centers in other countries
 List of zoos in the United States
 List of aquaria in the United States
 State wildlife trails (United States)

Resources
 Association of Nature Center Administrators
 North American Association for Environmental Education
 Environmental Education Week Nature Center Map -  National Environmental Education Foundation

 
Nature center
Nature center
Nature center
Nature center
Nature center
Nature center
Nature center
Nature center